Tom Richmond may refer to:

Tom Richmond (cricketer) (1890–1957), England Test cricketer
Tom Richmond (illustrator) (born 1966), American humorous illustrator and cartoonist
Tom Richmond (cinematographer) (1950–2022), American cinematographer
Tom Richmond (Montana politician), member of the Montana Senate
Thomas Richmond (1802–1874), British portrait painter
Thomas Richmond (miniature-painter) (1771–1837), English miniature-painter